Euproctis semisignata is a moth of the family Erebidae first described by Francis Walker in 1865. It is found in India and Sri Lanka.

The caterpillar is a serious pest on coconut inflorescences.

References

Moths of Asia
Moths described in 1865